John "Jock" Rutherford (12 October 1884 – 21 April 1963) was an English footballer who played in the Football League for Arsenal, Clapton Orient and Newcastle United. He played 11 times for England, and had a short and unsuccessful spell as manager of Stoke.

Club career
Born in Percy Main, North Shields, Northumberland, Rutherford was known for his longevity; he played nearly six hundred Football League and FA Cup matches, despite four seasons of football being cancelled due to World War I. He started his career at Newcastle United, making his debut in 1902 against West Bromwich Albion, scoring twice. Nicknamed  "the Newcastle flyer", he spent ten seasons at the "Magpies", as an outside right renowned for his pace and close control. Newcastle were a dominant force at the time with Rutherford picking up three First Division medals, and played in five FA Cup finals. Although Newcastle only won the 1910 final against Barnsley, by 2–1 in a replay. Rutherford himself scored the equaliser in the first match, in the very last minute of normal time for a 1–1 draw.

At the start of the 1913–14 season, Rutherford fell out with the Newcastle management over his wages, and he was promptly sold to Woolwich Arsenal, who had just been relegated to the Second Division. He made his Arsenal debut against Nottingham Forest on 1 November 1913 and scored twice in a 3–2 win, and quickly became a regular in the side. When the First World War broke out, Rutherford continued to guest for Arsenal in wartime matches. Despite being 35 when first-class football resumed in 1919, he continued to play regularly for Arsenal who had been promoted back to the First Division for another four seasons.

In March 1923 Rutherford was approached by Stoke, who had heard that he interested into moving into management. There were testing times for Stoke who after being promoted to the First Division the year before were now four points adrift at the bottom of the table with one win in 11. So it seemed perfect timing for Rutherford, at the age of 38 he was being offered not only the chance to take over the reins of a First Division club but to continue playing in a player-manager role, an offer he found too good to refuse. It was only when he arrived at the Victoria Ground on 3 April that he realised what poor condition the club was in. With five games of the 1922–23 season left, Stoke needed to win four to have any chance of staying up. It didn't happen and Stoke suffered relegation to the Second Division but there was optimism that an instant return could be had with Rutherford in charge.

But a strange set of circumstances led to his swift departure. Firstly his old club Arsenal held a retirement party for him where he was presented with a silver tea set. But instead of the party and gift acting as closure with Arsenal, it merely served to reacquaint him with former friends. Then he was involved in a car accident which left him unable to return to Stoke-on-Trent for the start of the 1923–24 season. Then the saga took a bizarre twist: as Stoke were still waiting him to return to the club, Rutherford instead quit and re-signed as a player for Arsenal. In total, he was in charge of Stoke for just four weeks, making him the club's shortest-serving manager.

The 39-year-old Rutherford re-signed for Arsenal in September, and played over twenty matches in each of the next two seasons. He retired in the summer of 1925, but found the temptation to play football too much, and promptly signed for Arsenal for a third time in January 1926, and played for the remainder of that season. He played his final match for the Gunners against Manchester City on 20 March 1926, at the age of 41 years and 159 days. With that, Rutherford set a record, as Arsenal's oldest ever first-team player, which still stands to this day.

Rutherford left Arsenal for the final time in the summer of 1926; in all, he played 232 matches and scored 27 goals for the club.
He spent a single season at Clapton Orient before finally hanging his boots up in 1927. In 1928 he came out of retirement and signed for Tunbridge Wells Rangers, playing in only one game in the FA Cup. After retiring, he settled in Neasden and ran an off-licence.

International career
While at Newcastle, Rutherford also played for England, making his debut against Wales on 9 April 1904. He went on to win eleven caps for his country and score three goals, making his last appearance against Bohemia, a country that technically did not exist at the time, in 1908.

Family
Rutherford's brothers Sep and Bob were also professional footballers. He was married twice: first to Edith Olive McQueen in May 1908with whom he had a son, John, who was on Arsenal's books at the same time as his father, but only ever played one League match for the cluband then to Blodwen Jones in 1944. His great-grandson Greg Rutherford is the 2012 Olympic long jump champion.

Career statistics

As a player
Source:

International
Source:

As a manager

Honours

Club
Newcastle United
 First Division: 1904–05, 1906–07, 1908–09
 FA Cup: 1910
 FA Charity Shield: 1909

Individual
Newcastle United Hall of Fame

References
 Specific

 General
 
 

1884 births
1963 deaths
People from Neasden
Sportspeople from North Shields
English footballers
England international footballers
Association football outside forwards
Arsenal F.C. players
Leyton Orient F.C. players
Newcastle United F.C. players
English football managers
Stoke City F.C. managers
Stoke City F.C. players
Tunbridge Wells F.C. players
English Football League managers
English Football League representative players
People from Percy Main
Footballers from Tyne and Wear
FA Cup Final players